The W.L. and Winnie (Woodfield) Belfrage Farmstead Historic District is a nationally recognized historic district located south of Sergeant Bluff, Iowa, United States. It was listed on the National Register of Historic Places in 2017.  At the time of its nomination it contained six resources, which included four contributing buildings and two non-contributing buildings. The four contributing buildings are the dairy barn (1910), farmhouse (1920), brooder house (c. 1945), and the chicken coop (c. 1945). The two no-contributing buildings are the cattle shed (1960) and the garage/utility building (2006).

Its significance is found in the Prairie School-style farmhouse designed by prominent Sioux City architect William L. Steele. This is the only known farmhouse designed by Steele. The other well-preserved agricultural buildings on an early twentieth-century farmstead are also of significance. Holtze Construction of Sioux City built the house, and it was the first building constructed by the new company. Aaron Gunderson built the dairy barn.

References

National Register of Historic Places in Woodbury County, Iowa
Farms on the National Register of Historic Places in Iowa
Historic districts on the National Register of Historic Places in Iowa
Historic districts in Woodbury County, Iowa
Prairie School architecture in Iowa